The Tujia language (Northern Tujia: , ; Southern Tujia: ,) is a Sino-Tibetan language spoken natively by the Tujia people in Hunan Province, China. It is unclassified within the Sino-Tibetan language family, due to pervasive influence from neighboring languages. There are two mutually unintelligible variants, Northern and Southern. Northern Tujia has 21 initials, whereas Southern Tujia has 26 (with 5 additional voiced initials). As for the finals, Northern Tujia has 25 and Southern Tujia has 30, 12 of which are used exclusively in loanwords from Chinese. Its verbs make a distinction of active and passive voices. Its pronouns distinguish the singular and plural numbers along with the basic and possessive cases. As of 2005, the number of speakers was estimated at 70,000 for Northern Tujia (of which about 100 are monolingual) and 1,500 for Southern Tujia, out of an ethnic population of 8 million.

Names
The Tujia people call their language .

 literally means 'native people', which is the appellation that the Han Chinese had given to them due to their aboriginal status in the area. The Tujia, on the other hand, call the Han Chinese , a designation also given to the Hakka people, which means 'guest people'. Tujia is also called "Bizic" by Yulou Zhou.

Classification
Tujia is clearly a Sino-Tibetan language, but its position within that family is unclear, due to massive borrowing from other Sino-Tibetan languages. Although it has been placed with other groups in the past, linguists now generally leave it unclassified.

Subdivisions
Tujia is divided into two major dialects. Almost all Tujia speakers are located in Xiangxi Tujia and Miao Autonomous Prefecture. The Northern dialect has the vast majority of speakers, while the Southern dialect is spoken in only 3 villages of  Tanxi Township in Luxi County.

Northern: Baojing County, Longshan County, Guzhang County, Yongshun County



Southern: Tanxi Township in Luxi County

The Tujia-speaking areas of Longshan County are mostly located around the Xiche River 洗车河. The variety studied by Tian (1986) is that of Dianfang Township 靛房乡, Longshan County. Ye focuses on the Northern variety of Xinghuo Village 星火村, Miao'ertan Township 苗儿滩镇 (formerly Miaoshi 苗市), Longshan County 龙山县. Peng covers the Northern variety of Yongshun County. Brassett based their Tujia data primarily on the variety of Tasha Township 他砂乡, Longshan County and also partly from Pojiao Township 坡脚乡 and Dianfang Township 靛房乡. Dai focuses on the variety of Xianren Township 仙仁乡, Baojing County. Zhang (2006) covers the Northern Tujia dialect of Duogu village 多谷村, Longshan County and the Southern Tujia dialect of Poluozhai 婆落寨, Luxi County.

Chen (2006)
Chen Kang divides Tujia as follows.

Northern
Longshan dialect 龙山土语  (autonym:  or Bifzivkar) - spoken in:
Longshan County: Jiashi 贾市, Zan'guo 咱果, Miaoshi 苗市, Pojiao 坡脚, Mengxi 猛西, Tasha 他砂, Shuiba 水坝, Guanping 官平, Neixi 内溪, Ganxi 干溪, Dianfang 靛房
Laifeng County, Hubei: Maodong 卯洞
Yongshun County: Shaoha 勺哈, Liexi 列夕, Duishan 对山, Gaoping 高坪, Taiping 太平
Guzhang County: Qietong 茄通, Tianjiadong 田家洞
Baojing dialect 保靖土语 (autonym:  or Mifqivkar) - spoken in:
Baojing County: Bamao 拔茅, Bi'er 比耳, Mawang 马王, Angdong 昂洞
Longshan County: Yanchong 岩冲
Southern - spoken in the following villages of Tanxi Township 潭溪乡, Luxi County:
Xiadu 下都 (Tujia:  or Cirbur)
Puzhu 铺竹 (Tujia:  or Puzzu)
Boluozhai 波洛寨 (Tujia:  or Bolozaif)
Qieji 且己 (Tujia:  or Ciejif)
Xiaqieji 下且己 (Tujia:  or Ciajifafdif)
Daboliu 大波流 (Tujia:  or Cierduovpor)
Xiaolingzhai 小零寨 (Tujia:  or Ciernifsa)
Limuzhai 梨木寨 (Tujia:  or Livmuvzaif)
Tumazhai 土麻寨 (Tujia:  or Tufmavzaiv)
Tanxi Town 潭溪镇 (Tujia:  or Huduo)

Yang (2011)
Yang Zaibiao reports that Tujia is spoken in over 500 natural villages comprising about 200 administrative villages and 34 townships. Yang covers the two Northern Tujia dialects of Dianfang 靛房 and Xiaolongre 小龙热, and the Southern Tujia dialect of Qieji 且己.

Longshan County (southeastern; 15 townships): Xichehe 洗车河镇, Longtou 隆头镇, Miao'ertan 苗儿滩镇, Dianfang 靛房镇, Luota 洛塔乡, Ganxi 干溪乡, Mengxi 猛西乡, Fengxi 凤溪镇, Pojiao 坡脚乡, Tasha 他砂乡, Neixi 内溪乡, Jiashi 贾市乡, Yanchong 岩冲乡, Changxi 长潭乡, Liye 里耶镇
Yongshun County (western; 5 townships): Duishan 对山乡, Heping 和平乡, Xiqi 西歧乡, Shouche 首车镇, Shaoha 勺哈乡
Baojing County (western and southeastern; 10 townships):
Western Baojing County: Longtou 隆头乡, Bi'er 比耳乡, Mawang 马王乡, Bamao 拔茅镇, Purong 普戎镇, Angdong 昂洞乡, Longxi 龙溪乡, Boji 簸箕乡
Southeastern Baojing County: Tuzha 涂乍乡, Xianren 仙人乡
Guzhang County (northwestern; 2 townships): Qietong 茄通 (including in Xiaolongre 小龙热村 ), Duanlong 断龙乡
Luxi County (1 township): Tanxi 潭溪镇 (including in Qieji 且己村  / )
Laifeng County (1 township): Hedong 河东乡

Phonology

Consonants 
The following are the consonants in both the Northern and Southern Tujia dialects:

 Voiced plosives and affricates, and  occur only in the Southern Tujia dialects.
  has allophones  before  and  before .

Vowels 

 Combinations with oral vowels  and nasal vowel  occur only in the Southern dialects.
 Combinations with vowels  and coda  occur only in the Northern dialects.

Orthography

Ye (1995)
One system of writing Tujia in Latin script is based on Hanyu Pinyin and uses letters as tone markers, namely, x, r, v, f.

Brassett, Brassett, & Lu (2006)
Philip Brassett, Cecilia Brassett and Lu Meiyan have proposed an experimental Pinyin orthography for the Tujia language, as follows:

Tujia numerals

Language preservation
Although only a small percentage of Tujia people speak the Tujia language, Tujia language enthusiasts work hard on to preserve it, both in Hunan and Hubei. According to news reports, two Tujia language instruction books have been published and work continues on a Tujia dictionary. The Tujia language scholar Chu Yongming (储永明) works with children at the Baifusi Ethnic Minorities School (百福司民族小学) in Baifusi Town, Laifeng County, Hubei to promote the language use.

References

Bibliography

.
.
.
.
.
.
.
.
.

External links

Tujia basic lexicon at the Global Lexicostatistical Database
ELAR archive of Documentation of the Southern Tujia Language of China

Proto-Tujia reconstruction (Sino-Tibetan Branches Project)

Languages of China
Unclassified Sino-Tibetan languages
Tujia people
Endangered Sino-Tibetan languages